Zamkan or Zemkan may refer to:
 Zamkan-e Olya
 Zamkan Rural District